The Rochester Knighthawks were a lacrosse team based in Rochester, New York, that played in the National Lacrosse League (NLL). The 2011 season was the 17th in franchise history. The Knighthawks finished tied with Buffalo and Toronto with the top record in the East, but finished in third place due to tiebreakers. They lost to the eventual champion Toronto Rock in the Division Semifinals.

Regular season

Conference standings

Game log
Reference:

Playoffs

Game log
Reference:

Roster

See also
2011 NLL season

References

Rochester Knighthawks seasons
2011 in lacrosse
Rochester Knighthawks